Martin de Hoyarçabal (Martin Oihartzabal in modern spelling) was a French Basque mariner.  Little is generally known about his life.  He was born in Ciboure, in the Iparralde, the French Basque Country. He is recognized for publishing one of the first Newfoundland pilots, a book which describes places and distances to aid sailors in navigation, in 1579. Les voyages aventureux du Capitaine Martin de Hoyarsabal, habitant du çubiburu was published in French  and was widely used by French and Spanish mariners for almost a century.

Hoyarçabal's Navigational Pilot
The Pilot is the only known extant work by Hoyarçabal. As a reference work, the Navigational Pilot was invaluable for ships traveling in the Newfoundland area.  The following is an example taken from Hoyarçabal's work; in this text, Hoyarçabal is giving distances between several places in Newfoundland:

With Cape S. Marie & Plaisence lying north northeast & south southeast, go 9 leagues. Further, you should know that when you will go from Cape S. Marie, along this route of north northwest, you will find a long point which is named Amigaiz, from which to Plaisence go 4 leagues, & from Cape S. Marie 5 leagues, after which you will have passed the aforementioned Amigaiz, you will find Plaisence.

In 1677, Pierre Detcheverry translated and expanded the Navigational Pilot into  Labourdin Basque. The following is the corresponding passage, demonstrating the looseness of the translation into Basque:

"Anyway, you have to know when you go that route that you will [see?] a point which is called point Mehea and from there to Placença, 5 leagues from there and from point Mehea to the cape, 4 l[eagues] [noizere] because you pass point Mehea soon Placença will be in the bay at the starboard side".

References

External links
 Bale arrantzaleak in Basque, about Basque whalers.
 Saint-Pierre et Miquelon and the Basque Country

Year of birth unknown
Year of death unknown
People from Labourd
French sailors
Basque-language writers
French-Basque people
French explorers
16th-century French people
History of Saint Pierre and Miquelon